OutKast FC was a Filipino women's football club which played at the PFF Women's League, the top women's football league in the Philippines.

Background
Formerly went under the name "Lady Tamz", OutKast was the alumni football club of the Far Eastern University.

The club's futsal team also won the women's division of the 2016 Philippine Futsal League and inaugural edition of the women's division 7's Football League.

Last squad

 

Source: Pinay Futbol

Officials
As of 3 December 2016

References

External links

Women's football clubs in the Philippines
PFF Women's League clubs
Far Eastern University